Schagen FM is the local public broadcasting company for the municipality of Schagen and the former municipality of Niedorp.

External links
 Website gemeente Schagen
 Nieuws over Schagen (Dutch)
 Website gemeente Zijpe
 Website gemeente Hollands Kroon
 Website gemeente Harenkarspel
 Nieuws over Harenkarspel (Dutch)
 Nieuws over Schagen, Zijpe, Niedorp en Harenkarspel (Dutch)
 Alles over Schagen FM, de lokale omroep voor Schagen, Zijpe, Niedorp en Harenkarspel (Dutch)

Radio stations in the Netherlands
Hollands Kroon
Mass media in Schagen